Howe Green may refer to the following places in England:

 Howe Green, Derbyshire
 Howe Green, Chelmsford, Essex
 Howe Green, Uttlesford, a hamlet in Great Hallingbury parish, Essex
 Howe Green, Warwickshire, a location
 Howegreen, a location in the Maldon district of Essex

See also
How Green, a location in Kent